XECB-AM is a radio station on 1460 AM in San Luis Río Colorado, Sonora, Mexico. It is owned by Radio Grupo OIR and is known as Radio Ranchito, carrying a ranchera format.

History

XECB received its concession on October 20, 1950. It broadcast on 1450 kHz and was owned by and named for Mexicali radio pioneer Carlos Blando. The 250-watt station upgraded power to 1,000 watts by the 1980s and was sold to its current concessionaire in 1994.

On November 13, 2002, XECB was cleared to move to 1460 kHz with higher power.

References

External links
Radio Ranchito 1460 AM Facebook

1950 establishments in Mexico
Radio stations established in 1950
Radio stations in Sonora
Regional Mexican radio stations
Spanish-language radio stations